Adam Clifford Smith (born 23 November 1992) is an English professional footballer who plays as a goalkeeper for  side Morecambe.

Career

Early career
Born in Sunderland, Smith joined Leicester City from Middlesbrough in 2010.

Early loan moves
On 16 September 2011 he was loaned to Chesterfield, but was only a backup to Greg Fleming during his spell.

In early January 2012 Smith joined Conference Premier club Lincoln City on loan, again as cover, until the end of the season.

On 25 October 2012, Smith signed for another Conference side in Nuneaton Town, on an initial one-month loan. Smith made his senior debut on 27 October in a 1–1 draw with Barrow, and went on to appear in seven games for the club.

On 11 January 2014 Smith was loaned to Football League One club Stevenage, in a one-month deal to provide cover following injuries to senior goalkeepers.

Cambridge United (loan)
On 25 April 2014, Smith moved to Conference Premier side Cambridge United on an emergency loan, following injuries to all of the club's senior goalkeepers. Smith made his debut the next day, in a 2–0 defeat to Gateshead on the final day of the League season. With Cambridge having already qualified for the 2013–14 Conference play-offs, Smith starred as Cambridge defeated Halifax Town 2–1 over two legs, Cambridge being 1–0 down after the first leg, to send the U's to Wembley and a chance at promotion to the Football League. On 18 May 2014, Smith played the full match as Cambridge defeated Gateshead 2–1 in the 2014 Conference play-off Final, to earn promotion to League Two.

Return to Leicester
On 27 June 2014 he signed a new two-year deal with Leicester. Following an injury to first-choice goalkeeper Kasper Schmeichel, Smith was on the substitutes bench for nine Premier League games during the first half of the 2014–15 season as cover for Ben Hamer, as well as featuring for the Leicester City U21s, keeping a clean sheet against Schalke in the Premier League International Cup.

Mansfield Town (loan)
On 9 January 2015, Smith moved on a one-month loan to League Two club Mansfield Town after Leicester's signing of Mark Schwarzer moved Smith back down to third choice. The following day, Smith made his Football League debut, starting in a 2–1 away loss against Burton Albion in which he came up against fellow Leicester City loanee Jacob Blyth.

Northampton Town
On 26 June 2015, Smith signed a two-year deal with League Two club Northampton Town.

Bristol Rovers
On 6 July 2017, Smith signed for League One club Bristol Rovers after leaving Northampton Town at the end of the season. He made his debut in a 1–0 away defeat to Charlton Athletic on 5 August 2017. He looked to have made an amazing save from a Patrick Bauer header tipping it onto the post, however the linesman and the referee judged that the ball had crossed the line.

He was released by Bristol Rovers at the end of the 2018–19 season.

Forest Green Rovers
Following his release from Bristol Rovers, Smith signed a two-year deal with Forest Green Rovers on 25 June 2019, active from 1 July 2019.

On 23 September 2019, Smith joined National League side Yeovil Town on a one-month loan deal. On 6 March 2020, Smith rejoined Yeovil on loan until the end of the 2019–20 season.

On 15 August 2020, Smith signed returned to Yeovil Town for a third loan spell on loan until the end of the 2020–21 season.

Stevenage
Smith signed for League Two club Stevenage on a short-term contract on 23 October 2021. He made his debut on the same day as his signing was announced, keeping a clean sheet in Stevenage's 0–0 draw with Leyton Orient.

On 22 January 2022, Stevenage confirmed that Smith had left the club.

Morecambe
On 4 February 2022, Smith joined League One side Morecambe on a short-term contract until the end of the 2021–22 season.

Personal life
In May 2015, Smith and teammates James Pearson and Tom Hopper made a sex tape with local women on Leicester's tour of Thailand, which was obtained by the Sunday Mirror. The three players apologised for making the video, which included a racial epithet towards the women. However, the trio were sacked by the club on 17 June 2015.

Career statistics

Honours
Individual
The Football League Team of the Season: 2015–16
PFA Team of the Year: 2015–16 League Two

References

External links

1992 births
Living people
Footballers from Sunderland
English footballers
Association football goalkeepers
Leicester City F.C. players
Chesterfield F.C. players
Lincoln City F.C. players
Nuneaton Borough F.C. players
Stevenage F.C. players
Cambridge United F.C. players
Mansfield Town F.C. players
Northampton Town F.C. players
Bristol Rovers F.C. players
Forest Green Rovers F.C. players
Yeovil Town F.C. players
Morecambe F.C. players
National League (English football) players
English Football League players